Serhiy Zelinsky is a retired Soviet and Ukrainian football player. He is known for his performances in the club of the Premier League Torpedo Zaporizhzhia, as well as performances in Ukrainian clubs of the lower league and in the top Belarusian division in the team Torpedo Mogilev.

Career
Serhiy Zelinsky was born in Chernihiv and is a pupil of the local Serhiy Zelinsky. The young football player made his debut in the local team Desna Chernihiv, which at that time played in the Soviet Second League, in 1989, and played in its composition until 1991. Zelinsky made his debut in the Ukrainian Premier League in September 1992 for the high-league club Torpedo Mogilev. Having played for the team in 10 matches of the Ukrainian championship, Serhiy Zelinsky became a player of the Ukrainian Second League team Krystal Kherson from Kherson. The footballer played for this team for a year and a half, but did not become a major player in it, and in early 1995 he returned to the Desna Chernihiv, which at that time played in the first Ukrainian league. However, during his performances Zelinsky also did not become a player of the team, and from the beginning of 1997 he played for the Chernihiv amateur teams "Domobudivnyk" and Tekstilnyk. In 1998, Sergei Zelinsky played in the club of the highest Belarusian division Torpedo Mogilev from Mogilev. After returning to Ukraine, the footballer played for the amateur teams GPZ from Varva and Sula from Luben. From July 1999, Zelinsky played for the Ukrainian First League club Volyn Lutsk from Lutsk, but in six months he left the team and became a player of the  Second League Russian club Tyumen from the city of the same name. After returning to Ukraine, the footballer again played for an amateur club from Druzhba-Nova Varva, now called Druzhba-Nova Varva, and finished his performances on the football fields.

Honours
Fakel Varva
 Ukrainian Football Amateur League: 1998–99
 Chernihiv Oblast Football Championship: 2001

Cheksyl Chernihiv
 Chernihiv Oblast Football Championship: 1997

Desna Chernihiv
 Ukrainian Second League: 1996–97

References

External links 
 Serhiy Zelinsky footballfacts.ru
 Serhiy Zelinsky allplayers.in.ua

1972 births
Living people
Soviet footballers
Footballers from Chernihiv
FC Desna Chernihiv players
FC Cheksyl Chernihiv players
FC Torpedo Zaporizhzhia players
FC Krystal Kherson players
FC Torpedo Mogilev players
FC Fakel Varva players
FC Volyn Lutsk players
FC Tyumen players
Ukrainian footballers
Ukrainian Second League players
Ukrainian expatriate sportspeople in Belarus
Ukrainian expatriate sportspeople in Russia
Expatriate footballers in Belarus
Expatriate footballers in Russia
Association football midfielders